Haris Asif is a Pakistani cricketer. He made his first-class debut for Khan Research Laboratories in the 2016–17 Quaid-e-Azam Trophy on 12 November 2016.

References

External links
 

Year of birth missing (living people)
Living people
Pakistani cricketers
Khan Research Laboratories cricketers
Place of birth missing (living people)